Amphipsalta, commonly known as clapping cicadas, is a genus of cicada in the family Cicadidae. This genus is endemic to New Zealand.

Species
 Amphipsalta cingulata (Fabricius, 1775) 
 Amphipsalta strepitans (Kirkaldy, 1909) 
 Amphipsalta zelandica (Boisduval, 1835)

References

Cicadas of New Zealand
Cicadettini
Cicadidae genera